City 7 TV is the United Arab Emirates first English language television channel producing various local programmes spread throughout the viewing day. CITY 7 TV is a satellite television channel accessible to all viewers free-to- air on Nilesat 101. It is also available on Channel 1 of Showtime, Channel 140 on e-vision and Du IPTV.

Originally called 'IN TV' and launched in December 2004 by Pakistani Business man Ali Mahmood. Then channel was later re-launched as City 7 TV by Mohi-Din BinHendi, a UAE national who saw a great opportunity to address the needs of both an expatriate audience and modern Arabs looking for local programming in English. In the last year of operation, the channel has expanded with the introduction of several locally produced news and entertainment shows. These include news, business and programmes on cars, cooking, shopping, sports, fashion, children. City 7 TV is a free-to-air channel and is available on Nilesat 101, channel 1 on Showtime, channel 89 on all E-vision packages and Du IPTV.

City 7 TV was closed down on April 20, 2017.

Demographics
City 7 TV caters to the English speaking community across the Middle East, making its reach the widest in the region. City7 TV programming covers a range of genres, including News, Business, Current Affairs, Entertainment, Cars & Safety, Lifestyle, Fashion, Culture, Nightlife including host Susie iliyan's show 'Dubai 'n I' & 'Out & About', Sport and children’s programming.

The Channel is watched by the multicultural population of the UAE & the rest of the MENA region, and has the added advantage of being the only channel reaching out to visitors, tourists and business travellers to the UAE.

Content

Original Shows 
 That Women's Show - Original hosts: Julie Matthews Borchardt, Claire Gilchrist, Danya Hejazi & Susie Iliyan - Producer: Ramin Hashemian
City Women - original hosts Julie Mathiews, Susie iliyan, Hanane Spiers (was Taalah) and Lara Tabet.
 In Gear - Original host: Hanane Spiers (was Taalah), Caitlin Hughes - Producer: Ramin Hashemian
 Kids Club
 Society
 Chefs in the City

Other Shows 
 Heart Break High
 Gamer.tv
 The Basil Brush Show
 Balamory
 Tweenies
 Budgie the Little Helicopter
 Spot
 Dr Otter
 The Hoobs
 What's New Scooby-Doo?
 The Powerpuff Girls
 Disney's House of Mouse
 Codename: Kids Next Door
 Super Robot Monkey Team
 Lilo & Stitch
 JoJo's Circus
 Tiny Toon Adventures
 Brilliant Creatures
 The Story of Tracy Beaker
 Minder
 Keeping Up Appearances
 Water Rats
 Blue Heelers
 Open All Hours

Re-launch and subsequent turbulence 
City 7 TV was relaunched in 2007, with new programmes and a new name. However, signs of troubles begin emerging in December 2007 when the then CEO resigned, seeking a "different environment". In October 2008, the channel's 130 staff members were not paid their wages for that month. In a candid, televised interview broadcast on City 7, owner Mohidin Bin Hendi said City 7 must be "proactive". While he stated he would not sell out the channel although he might consider it if it was the right offer by the right person. The staff were then paid their regular wages.

References

External links 
 Official Website

Television stations in Dubai
Television channels and stations established in 2002
Television channels and stations disestablished in 2017
2002 establishments in the United Arab Emirates
2017 disestablishments in the United Arab Emirates
English-language television stations